Rear Admiral Clarence "Johnny" Howard-Johnston  (1903–1996) was a British soldier and inventor. Later, as an admiral, he specialised in anti-submarine warfare during the inter-war years.

Clarence Johnston's parents were American and Scottish, and both families were involved in engineering. He was brought up in Nice, France and later adopted the name Howard-Johnston, appending one of his father's forenames to his surname to distinguish himself from being the bearer of a common surname. He was known as "Johnny", as he disliked the name Clarence.

According to one source, Howard-Johnston entered the Royal Navy in 1917 but his obituary in The Times says he first went to sea in 1922 as a midshipman. The sources differ, too, regarding the next phase of his career, with The Times saying he spent some time on secondment in France and then was posted to China as second-in-command of  but another version saying that he was a lieutenant in 1925 when he served on HMS Tarantula on the Yangtze river. It was here that he invented the Towed Asdic Repeater Target. After Viscount he spent some time on secondment to the Royal Hellenic Navy, where he was decorated by the Greeks.

By the outbreak of the Second World War, he was back at the Admiralty but in 1940 was taken to organise anti-submarine operations in Norway. He received a DSC here, although not for anti-submarine duties: instead, for the evacuations at Andalsnes and Molde. A month later, he was ordered to demolish the port facilities at St Malo, and received a Mention in Dispatches for this work.

Howard-Johnston was then transferred to command  on the north Atlantic convoys, for which he received another Mention in Dispatches – and then the DSO, for the sinking of U-651. He was then transferred to Liverpool, to train others, before being promoted to captain in 1943, and had been made director of the Anti-Submarine Division at the Admiralty.

There were no survivors. In 1953, he was promoted to rear-admiral, and served on NATO staff before finally retiring.

Marriages
Howard-Johnston was married three times. He had a son from his first marriage, who died on the Affray, and later married Lady Alexandra Henrietta Louisa Haig, a daughter of Field Marshal Earl Haig, with whom he had two sons and a daughter before that marriage also ended in divorce. His final marriage was to Paulette Helleu and was childless.

References

External links 

 The Papers of Rear-Admiral Clarence Howard-Johnston held at Churchill Archives Centre

1906 births
1996 deaths
Royal Navy admirals of World War II
British people of Scottish descent
British people of American descent
20th-century British inventors